Panov is minor seamount in the southeast Pacific located near the western part of the Valdivia Fracture Zone.

Seamounts of the Pacific Ocean